An election to Monaghan County Council took place on 10 June 1999 as part of that year's Irish local elections. 20 councillors were elected from four local electoral areas  for a five-year term of office on the system of proportional representation by means of the single transferable vote (PR-STV).

Results by party

Results by Electoral Area

Carrickmacross

Castleblayney

Clones

Monaghan

External links
 Official website

1999 Irish local elections
Monaghan County Council elections